Junland is an unincorporated community in Butler County, in the U.S. state of Missouri.

The community is at the junction of Missouri routes B (old Route 60) and Z five miles east of Poplar Bluff. It was a station on the Missouri Pacific Railroad.

The shortening and alteration of "jungleland", which apparently was descriptive of the condition of the original town site.

References

Unincorporated communities in Butler County, Missouri
Unincorporated communities in Missouri